Stephen Flatow is an American lawyer  notable for initiating a series of lawsuits targeting the Islamic Republic of Iran and several international banks who processed transactions on Iran's behalf, which were linked to terrorist activities.

Flatow is the father of Alisa Flatow, who was killed in a suicide bombing attack on a bus carried out by militants belonging to the Islamic Jihad Movement in Palestine group near Kfar Darom in the Gaza Strip in 1995. After his daughter's death, Flatow commenced a series of lawsuits against the government of Iran. An amendment to the US Foreign Sovereign Immunities Act of 1976, which enabled Flatow to successfully sue Iran as a state sponsor of terrorism is named after him ("The Flatow Amendment").

Beginning in 2006, he has helped the United States government identify parties illegally processing financial transactions for Iran.

He has also written op-eds on issues related to terrorism and Israel for a number of media outlets. In one, he discusses historical figures who, he says, would have "scoffed" and "laughed" at the idea that the Palestinians have any claim to East Jerusalem. He adds that: "Palestinian national identity is a recent and shallow invention, created not because Palestinians are any different from Jordanians or Syrians, but simply to be used as a weapon against the Jews."

A Father's Story 
Flatow published a 2018 memoir, A Father’s Story: My Fight for Justice Against Iranian Terror, about his response to the murder of his daughter.

References

External links
 FLATOW v. ISLAMIC REPUBLIC OF IRAN

Year of birth missing (living people)
Living people
American writers
Jewish American attorneys
21st-century American Jews